The Pratt River is a river in King County in Washington.  It is a tributary of the Middle Fork Snoqualmie River.  It was named for prospector George A Pratt, who discovered nearby iron deposits in 1887.

The river has its headwaters in tiny Upper Melakwa Lake.  The river starts out as a small stream upon exiting the lake.  The river soon enters much larger and better known Melakwa Lake.   The river after exiting Melakwa Lake, drops down the headwall below the lake starts to turn north.  The river flows generally north until it converges with the Middle Fork Snoqualmie River.

Tributaries 

Tushohatchie Creek
Kulla Kulla Creek
Kaleetan Creek
Thompson Creek

See also
List of rivers in Washington

References

External links

Rivers of Washington (state)
Rivers of King County, Washington
Wild and Scenic Rivers of the United States